Telmo Ferreira Castanheira (born 13 April 1992) is a Portuguese footballer who plays for Sabah as a midfielder in Malaysia Super League.

Football career
On 7 September 2014, Castanheira made his professional debut with Vitória Guimarães B in a 2014–15 Segunda Liga match against Leixões.

References

External links

Stats and profile at LPFP 

1992 births
Living people
Footballers from Porto
Association football midfielders
Portuguese footballers
G.D. Tourizense players
S.C. Freamunde players
Vitória S.C. B players
Gondomar S.C. players
Leixões S.C. players
C.D. Santa Clara players
C.D. Trofense players
Íþróttabandalag Vestmannaeyja players
Segunda Divisão players
Liga Portugal 2 players
Úrvalsdeild karla (football) players
1. deild karla players
Portuguese expatriate footballers
Expatriate footballers in Iceland
Portuguese expatriate sportspeople in Iceland